There are several world championships in Renju organized by the Renju International Federation, including World Championship, Women World Championships, Team World Championships, Youth World Championships and Correspondence World Championships.

World Championships 
Renju World Championships have occurred every second year, since 1989. The opening rule was Yamaguchi from 2009 to 2015, and has been changed to Soosõrv-8 since 2017.

The results of previous World Championships are following:

The statistics for the players in the Renju World Championships following.

Women World Championships 
The Women World Championships started in 1997 and are played every second year, at the same time and place with the World Championships. The results are following:

Team World Championships 
Team World Championships in Renju have occurred every second year since 1996, except for 2020. Since 2010 the opening rule being played is Yamaguchi.
The results are following.

The statistics for the Renju Team World Championships following.

Youth World Championships 
Renju Youth World Championships have occurred every second year since 1996.

The results of Youth World Championships of different groups for boys are following:

The results of Youth World Championships of different groups for girls are following:

Since 2020, due to the spread of COVID-19, a new series of Youth World Cups have been held online, in place of the Youth World Championships. 

The results of Youth World Cups of different groups for boys are following:

The results of Youth World Cups of different groups for girls are following:

International Open Tournaments of World Championship 
The International Open Tournaments of World Championship (BT) started in 1989 and happens every two years, at the same time and place with the World Championship (AT). This tournament is open to all Renju players who do not have the right to play in the World Championship. The first three places in BT have the right to participate in the Qualification Tournament (QT) of the next World Championship. There are no world champion titles awarded in this tournament.

The results of previous International Open Tournaments of World Championship are following:

Renju World Championships via Correspondence 
World Championships in Renju via Correspondence were held in 1982 to 1993 (by paper letters, later by e-mails), and now are played every year since 1996 with an exception in 2009, 2010 and 2016. Since 2014 the opening rule being played is Soosõrv-N.

The results from 1982 to 1993 are in the following.

The results since 1996 are in the following.

See also 

 Renju
 Renju International Federation
 RIF rating list

References 

Renju competitions
renju